La Flaca is the debut album by the Spanish Latin rock group Jarabe de Palo, released in 1996. The album was produced by Joe Dworniak for Virgin Records España. Immediately after its release, the album obtained a poor commercial reception, selling only 12,000 copies within seven months. However, when the title-track of the album was used as a TV advertisement, the album became a commercial success in Spain, reaching number one on the charts and being certified six times platinum for domestic shipments exceeding 600,000 copies. Released in Europe, Latin America and the United States, it also received gold and platinum status in several other countries, including Italy, where it peaked at number two and was certified triple platinum by the Federation of the Italian Music Industry.

Track listing 
All words and lyrics by Jarabe de Palo

Personnel 

Pau Donés - Vocals, Guitar
Joan Gené - Bass (except in "La Flaca" and "Grita")
Jordi Mena - Guitar
Daniel Forcada - Percussion (except in "El lado oscuro")
Alex Tenas - Drums

Other personnel

Carlos de France - Bass in "Grita"
Joe Dworniak - Bass in "La Flaca"
Antonio Martínez - Spanish guitar
Nigel Roberts - Keyboards

Charts and certifications

Peak positions

Certifications 

|-
!scope="row"|Chile (IFPI Chile)
|Gold
|5,000x
|-

|-
!scope="row"|Uruguay (CUD)
|Gold
|2,000x
|-

References

External links 
Official webpage
Jarabe de Palo

1996 albums
Jarabe de Palo albums